Riyad Pasha (1835 or 1836–1911) was an Egyptian statesman. His name can also be spelled Riaz Pasha and Riyāḍ Bāshā. He served as Prime Minister of Egypt three times during his career. His first term was between September 21, 1879 and September 10, 1881. His second term was from June 9, 1888 to May 12, 1891. His final term lasted from January 17, 1893 to April 16, 1894.

Origin and ascension
Riyad was of a Circassian family, but was said to be of Jewish ancestry. Little is known of his early life, except that, until the accession of Isma'il Pasha to the Khedivate of Egypt in 1863, he occupied a humble position.

Ismail, recognizing in this obscure individual a capacity for hard work and a strong will, made him one of his ministers, to find, to his chagrin, that Riyad was also an honest man possessed of a remarkable independence of character. When Ismail's financial straits compelled him to agree to a commission of inquiry, Riyad was the only Egyptian of known honesty sufficiently intelligent and patriotic to be named as a vice-president of the commission. He filled this office with distinction, but not to the liking of Ismail.

Khedive Ismail, however, felt compelled to nominate Riyad as a member of the first Egyptian cabinet, when, as a sop to his European creditors, he assumed the position of a constitutional monarch in 1878. For the few months this government lasted (September 1878 - April 1879) Riyad was minister of the interior. When Ismail dismissed the cabinet and attempted to resume autocratic rule, Riyad fled the country.

Administration
Upon the deposition of Ismail, in June 1879, Riyad was sent for by the British and French controllers, and he formed the first ministry under Khedive Tawfiq. His administration, marked by much ability, lasted only two years, and was overthrown by the agitation which had Urabi Pasha as its figurehead. Riyad treated the beginnings of this movement as of no consequence. In reply to a warning of what might happen he said, "But this is Egypt; such things do not happen; you say they have happened elsewhere, perhaps, but this is Egypt." He held the additional titles of Minister of Finance and Minister of Interior from 1879 to 1881. On the evening of 9 September 1881, after the military demonstration in Abdin Square, Riyad was dismissed; broken in health he went to Europe, remaining at Geneva until the fall of Urabi.

After Urabi's fall, Riyad accepted office as minister of the interior under Muhammad Sharif Pasha. Had Riyad had his way, Urabi and his associates would have been executed forthwith; so when the British insisted that clemency should be extended to the leaders of the revolt, Riyad refused to remain in office as interior minister, resigning in December 1882.

He took no further part in public affairs until 1888, when, on the dismissal of Nubar Pasha, he was summoned to form a government. He now understood that the only policy possible for an Egyptian statesman was to work in harmony with the British agent, Sir Evelyn Baring (later known as Lord Cromer). This he succeeded in doing to a large extent, witnessing if not initiating the practical abolition of the corvée and many other reforms. The appointment of an Anglo-Indian official as judicial adviser to the khedive was, however, opposed by Riyad, who resigned in May 1891.

In January 1893, he again became prime minister under Abbas II, being selected as comparatively acceptable both to the khedivial and British parties. In April 1894 Riyad finally resigned office on account of ill-health.

Personality
Superior, probably, both intellectually and morally to his great rival Nubar, he lacked the latter's broad statesmanship as well as his pliability. Riyad's standpoint was that of the benevolent autocrat; he believed that the Egyptians were not fitted for self-government and must be treated like children, protected from ill-treatment by others and prevented from injuring themselves. In 1889 he was made an honorary GCMG. A worthy tribute to Riyad was paid by Lord Cromer in his farewell speech at Cairo on 4 May 1907.

 Little or no courage is now required on the part of a young Egyptian who poses as a reformer, but it was not always so. Ismail Pasha had some very drastic methods of dealing with those who did not bow before him. Nevertheless, some thirty years ago Riaz Pasha stood forth boldly to protest against the maladministration that then prevailed in Egypt. He was not afraid to bell the cat.

References 

1830s births
1911 deaths
19th-century prime ministers of Egypt
Prime Ministers of Egypt
Finance Ministers of Egypt
Interior Ministers of Egypt
Egyptian pashas
Honorary Knights Grand Cross of the Order of St Michael and St George